Diane Renee Thomas (January 7, 1946 – October 21, 1985) was an American screenwriter who wrote the 1984 film Romancing the Stone and also co-wrote Steven Spielberg's 1989 film Always. She was also originally hired to write the third Indiana Jones movie, finishing a draft for what would be a "haunted mansion movie" before the decision was made to make a different movie.

Early life

Thomas was born January 7, 1946, in Sault Ste. Marie, Michigan. Her family moved to Long Beach, California, when she was 12 years old. She attended the University of Southern California and majored in business. Then she worked as an advertising copywriter, wrote travel brochures, took acting classes, and worked toward a degree in psychology.

Career

Romancing the Stone 
In 1978, while working on Romancing the Stone, Thomas was a waitress at Coral Beach Cantina on the Pacific Coast Highway.
 
It took less than a week for her agent, Norman Kurland, to sell the script. Kurland had sent it to several major studios. Actor/producer Michael Douglas and Columbia Pictures bought the script, though the film would later be made by 20th Century Fox.

According to other accounts, the sale of the screenplay was a Cinderella story in itself: Thomas pitched the story directly to Douglas when the actor happened to come into her cafe as a customer. This account, however, is disputed.

"It just had a spontaneity about the writing," Douglas said of the screenplay that would launch Thomas's career. "She was not cautious. The script had a wonderful spirit about it. ... There was a total lack of fear to the writing. It worked." The screenplay for Romancing the Stone sold for $250,000.

Other work 
After Romancing the Stone, Thomas wrote another screenplay titled either Blonde Hurricane or Blond Hurricane, an adaptation of P. Howard's book of the same name.

Thomas's death came six weeks before the sequel to Romancing the Stone, The Jewel of the Nile, was released. At the time, Thomas was busy writing for the movie Always (1989) for Steven Spielberg and was not available to write The Jewel of the Nile (for which she received a "Based on characters created by" credit).

At the time of her death, she was also working on a script for the third Indiana Jones film, reportedly set in a haunted mansion. Steven Spielberg, however, was apparently resistant to the haunted mansion approach, feeling it too closely resembled his earlier film Poltergeist. Thomas had completed the first draft.

Death
On October 21, 1985, Thomas, her boyfriend, and another friend attended classes at Pepperdine University and had stopped for drinks on the way home. Because her boyfriend had the least to drink, he told police, he was driving the group in Thomas's Porsche Carrera when the car, traveling about 80 miles per hour, spun around on the rain-slick Pacific Coast Highway and struck a telephone pole just south of Coastline Drive near Topanga, California. Thomas, a backseat passenger, was killed instantly. The other friend, 40-year-old Ian Young, was taken to UCLA Medical Center, where he died from his injuries two hours later. Thomas's boyfriend was hospitalized with internal injuries and "was arrested for investigation of driving under the influence of alcohol," though no further legal action about the matter was reported.

Diane Thomas Screenwriting Awards
Following her death, the UCLA Extension Writers' Program created the Diane Thomas Screenwriting Awards in her honor.  Original judges included Steven Spielberg, Michael Douglas, James Brooks, and Kathleen Kennedy. One such winner of this award is Randi Mayem Singer who later went on to write Mrs. Doubtfire.

References

External links
 
 Google News: Diane Thomas - newspapers clipping

1946 births
1985 deaths
20th-century American screenwriters
20th-century American women writers
American women screenwriters
People from Sault Ste. Marie, Michigan
Road incident deaths in California
Screenwriters from California
Screenwriters from Michigan
University of Southern California alumni
Writers from Long Beach, California